Joaquín Fernández may refer to:

Joaquín Fernández de Portocarrero Mendoza (1681–1760), Spanish cardinal marquis
Joaquín Fernández Prida (1863–1942), Spanish lawyer and politician
Joaquín Fernández (swimmer) (born 1971), Spanish swimmer
Joaquín Fernández de Piérola Marín (born 1974), Spanish businessman
Joaquín Fernández (footballer, born 1996), Spanish footballer
Joaquín Fernández (footballer, born 1999), Uruguayan footballer